Mary de Cork is a short novel by French author Joseph Kessel, published in 1929 by Gallimard.

Film adaptation
The 1967 telefilm adaptation starred Alain Bouvette and Pascal Bressy and was directed by Catherine Deneuve.
The 1989 telefilm adaptation starred Valérie Mairesse and was directed by Robin Davis and Bernard-Pierre Donnadieu.

References

External links
Mary de Cork

1929 French novels
Novels by Joseph Kessel